Mark Alexandrovich Ivanir is a Ukrainian-born Israeli actor known for his character roles on American film and television. He is fluent in six languages, a skill often shown off in his performances.

Early life 
Ivanir was born in Chernovtsi (now Chernivtsi), Ukrainian SSR. His family emigrated to Israel in 1972, and settled in the Pardes Katz neighbourhood of Bnei Brak. His father, Alexander, was an English teacher, and his mother, Malka, a German teacher. His maternal grandfather, Meshulem Surkis, was a Yiddish writer, journalist, actor, and theatre critic, who was a well known activist in the Yiddish cultural world. He was raised in a multilingual household; speaking Hebrew, Ukrainian, and Russian, and later learning English.

His national service in the Israeli Defense Forces saw him involved in Operation Joshua, one of two operations by the IDF to bring Ethiopian Jews from Sudanese refugee camps to Israel. After completing his service, he turned down a job offer from Mossad. He briefly studied medicine, before deciding to a life in the performing arts. He completed two years in a circus school, traveled throughout Europe performing on the streets as a clown, and ended up working in the Parisian Cirque Pawelles. After leaving the circus, Mark entered into formal theatrical training under famed Israeli director Nissan Nativ, performing at the Cameri Theater and Israeli Opera.

Career
During this time, Ivanir had his first film role in the 1988 action film Iron Eagle II, directed by Sidney J. Furie. The film was a Canadian-Israeli-American co-production filmed in Israel with an international cast. Ivanir played a Soviet army serviceman, Mikhail Balyonev.

Following his studies with Nativ, Ivanir joined the Gesher Theater, a Tel Aviv-based company composed of emigrants from the former USSR. Within two years, Gesher became Israel's top theatrical outfit and was hailed by the London Times as "one of the six best theatre companies in the world." Using his knowledge of multiple languages, Ivanir translated and adapted eight foreign-language plays into Hebrew for the company. He later moved to London to study under Philippe Gaulier at the Complicité.

Ivanir's first major film role was in Steven Spielberg's 1993 Oscar-winning epic Schindler's List, where he played Marcel Goldberg. He worked with Spielberg twice thereafter, first for a cameo appearance in The Terminal, then again for The Adventures of Tintin: The Secret of the Unicorn. Ivanir held a pivotal role in Robert De Niro's 2006 film, The Good Shepherd, for which he won the Silver Bear Award at the Berlin Film Festival, later landing a role in Barry Levinson's What Just Happened, this time acting alongside De Niro.

In 2011, he appeared in Universal's Johnny English Reborn, Universal's Big Miracle and 360.

His biggest part to date was on the critically acclaimed A Late Quartet, released from RKO pictures in the United States, in fall 2012. The film was voted as one of the New York Daily News 10 top films of the year. Ivanir played Daniel Lerner, the first violin of the string quartet, whose other members are played by Philip Seymour Hoffman, Catherine Keener and Christopher Walken.

Ivanir has had over 60 guest star and guest lead roles on television shows such as 24, Monk, CSI: NY, Law & Order, Fringe, CSI: Miami, Nikita and Royal Pains.

In 2016 Ivanir had a recurring role on Homeland as Russian intelligence agent Ivan Krupin. The season was nominated for the SAG Awards and for the Emmy's.

In 2017, he played a Holocaust survivor in the critically acclaimed German-language film "Bye Bye Germany" and recurred on Amazon's "Transparent". As of August 2019, Amazon Prime is airing worldwide the Israeli hit show "The Beauty and the Baker", with Ivanir playing the part of Zvika Granot.

In 2018, he co-starred in the film Entebbe, directed by José Padilha, the creator of Narcos, and Bill Hader's HBO comedy Barry, in which he recurs as three Chechen brothers. He appeared in The Red Sea Diving Resort, as the head of the Mossad, alongside Sir Ben Kingsley, Chris Evans and Greg Kinnear.

Personal life
Ivanir is married to Maya Raz, an IDF broadcaster. His sister-in-law is actress Romi Aboulafia, and his father-in-law is journalist Menashe Raz. He has two daughters, and resides with his family in Los Angeles.

Ivanir is fluent in Hebrew, Russian, English, Ukrainian, French and Yiddish, and adept in German and Arabic. His multi-lingualism is often a feature of his roles.

Filmography

Film

Television

Video games

References

External links
 
 "Mark Ivanir Lives for Shady Characters". The Jewish Journal of Greater Los Angeles.

Living people
Israeli male film actors
Israeli male stage actors
Israeli male television actors
Israeli male voice actors
Israeli people of Ukrainian-Jewish descent
Actors from Chernivtsi
Year of birth missing (living people)
20th-century Israeli male actors
21st-century Israeli male actors
Ukrainian SSR emigrants to Israel